The North Portland Harbor is an Oregon waterway or channel in Multnomah County, specifically in Portland. Flowing generally northwest, the channel rejoins the main stem slightly upstream of Kelley Point Park and the mouth of the Willamette River.

The Interstate Bridge carries Interstate 5 (I-5) over the channel, and farther downstream the Oregon Slough Railroad Bridge carries rail traffic. The BNSF Railway crosses North Portland Harbor over the rail bridge. 

Terminal 6 of the Port of Portland lies along the mainland shore of the channel. Northeast Marine Drive runs roughly parallel to the channel for much of its length. 

The official name registered with the United States Board on Geographic Names is North Portland Harbor, although historically other names have been applied. These include Oregon Slough and Hayden Slough.

See also
List of rivers of Oregon

References

External links
 

Bodies of water of Oregon
Hayden Island, Portland, Oregon
Kenton, Portland, Oregon
Multnomah County, Oregon
North Portland, Oregon
Northeast Portland, Oregon
Water transportation in Oregon
Waterways in the United States